The Limnophorini are a tribe of flies, belonging to the family Muscidae. Although the name-giving genus is Limnophora, this was actually described only after the more characteristic and easily recognized Lispe.

Genera
Genera are:
 Agenamyia Albuquerque, 1953  
 Albertinella Couri & Carvalho, 2005 
 Drepanocnemis Stein, 1911 
 Limnophora Robineau-Desvoidy, 1830 
 Lispe Latreille, 1796
 Lispoides Malloch, 1917
 Pachyceramyia Albuquerque, 1955 
 Rhabdotoptera Stein, 1919 
 Spilogona Schnabl, 1911 
 Syllimnophora Speiser, 1923 
 Tetramerinx Berg, 1898
 Thaumasiochaeta Stein, 1911
 Villeneuvia Schnabl & Dziedzicki, 1911

References

Muscidae
Brachycera tribes